Elephant is a 2003 American psychological drama film written, directed, and edited by Gus Van Sant. It takes place in Watt High School (which had shut down before filming due to chemicals), in the suburbs of Portland, Oregon, and chronicles the events surrounding a school shooting, based in part on the 1999 Columbine High School massacre. The film begins a short time before the shooting occurs, following the lives of several characters both in and out of school, who are unaware of what is about to unfold. The film stars mostly new or non-professional actors, including John Robinson, Alex Frost, and Eric Deulen.

Elephant is the second film in Van Sant's "Death Trilogy"—the first is Gerry (2002) and the third Last Days (2005)—all three of which are based on actual events.

Although Elephant was controversial for its subject matter and allegations of influence on the Red Lake shootings, it was generally praised by critics and received the Palme d'Or at the 2003 Cannes Film Festival, in which Patrice Chéreau was the head of the jury.

Plot
At the start of the film, John McFarland is being driven to school by his father, who is driving erratically down the road. Noticing the damage done to the car, John realizes that his father is drunk and makes him move to the passenger seat so he can drive. When John arrives at school late, he is reprimanded by the principal, Mr. Luce.

The majority of the film is spent following several high school students going about their daily lives just before a school shooting. In addition to John, who struggles with controlling his alcoholic father, photography student Elias builds a portfolio of other students. Outcast Michelle struggles with her body issues and assists in the library. Bulimics Nicole, Brittany, and Jordan gripe about their parents and squabble while popular athlete and lifeguard Nathan meets with his girlfriend, Carrie. Acadia, a close friend of John's, attends a Gay-Straight Alliance meeting.

Unknown to anyone, two other students, Alex and Eric, are preparing to carry out a bomb/shooting attack on their school. Flashbacks throughout the film show them preparing for the massacre by ordering weapons online and formulating an attack plan. The two have a brief sexual encounter in the shower after they both admit that they've never kissed anyone before. Their motives for the shooting appear vague; the film provides evidence suggesting bullying, neglect, violent video games, and Nazism.

On the day of the shooting, the pair make their way to school in Alex's car. Alex is armed with a Carbon-15 and a shotgun while Eric has a TEC-9. As they enter the school, they encounter John, and Alex tells him to leave. Realizing what is about to happen, John tries to warn students and teachers outside not to go into the school, but few people listen. He then notices his dad is missing after they arrived earlier and goes looking for him.

Alex and Eric plant propane bombs in the cafeteria, hoping to blow it up and shoot people as they try to escape the fire. When the bombs fail, they decide to start shooting indiscriminately. The pair head into the library, where Elias photographs them right before they open fire on students. Michelle is killed, while Elias' fate is left unclear. Other students quickly realize that the gunfire is real and begin to panic, and teachers begin evacuating students.

Alex and Eric split up to opposing ends of the school to continue their shooting. Alex enters the girls' bathroom where he surprises Jordan, Nicole, and Brittany, presumably shooting all three. A student attending the Gay-Straight Alliance meeting enters the hallway investigating the gunfire and is shot dead. The alliance members evacuate through a window save for Acadia, who freezes at the sight of her dead classmate. Benny, an African-American student athlete, finds her and helps her out the window before deciding to find the shooters.  Because he is so calm the entire time, it has been theorized by some viewers that Benny is suicidal, and uses  Alex and Eric as means to achieve his end.

Outside the school, John finds his now sobered-up father, who tries to comfort his son as the shooting continues. While helping students escape, Mr. Luce is cornered and threatened by Eric, prompting Mr. Luce to try and reason with him. Benny walks up behind Eric, and Eric abruptly turns around and shoots Benny dead. Eric tells Mr. Luce not to treat kids like him and Alex poorly. He then lets Mr. Luce go, only to gun him down seconds later.

Alex enters the cafeteria, which is strewn with overturned chairs, backpacks, several dead bodies, and numerous abandoned half-eaten lunches, and sits down. Alex picks up a cup from an abandoned lunch and casually drinks from it. Eric meets up with him, and they have a brief conversation about who they've shot, which ends when Alex shoots Eric mid-sentence. Alex leaves the cafeteria, showing no emotion over killing Eric, and discovers Carrie and Nathan hiding in a freezer. He tauntingly recites "Eeny, meeny, miny, moe" to them to decide whom he should kill first. The film then cuts to credits leaving the ending ambiguous.

Cast
 Alex Frost as Alex, the more intelligent of the two killers, implied to be the one in charge. He is an accomplished but frustrated pianist and sketch artist. He and Eric kiss before the massacre, both citing the fact that they had never been kissed.
 Eric Deulen as Eric, a slacker, Alex's friend, and the other killer. He is less intelligent than Alex, and Alex is obviously aware of this.  He is shot in the chest by Alex near the end of the film, while talking about whom he had killed earlier. 
 John Robinson as John McFarland, Alex's friend who has trouble at school while managing his alcoholic father.  Alex warns him to stay away from the massacre. 
 Timothy Bottoms as Mr. McFarland, John's alcoholic father.
 Matt Malloy as Mr. Luce, the principal of the school. Cornered by Eric, who briefly spares him, he is presumed dead after being shot several times.
 Elias McConnell as Elias, a photography student building his portfolio with portraits of other students.
 Nathan Tyson and Carrie Finklea as Nathan and Carrie, a popular lifeguard/football player and his girlfriend. Alex taunts them with Eeny, meeny, miny, moe.  
 Kristen Hicks as Michelle, a nerdy girl ashamed of her body. The film follows her through the locker room and into the library where she assists, it is there that she is the first to die in the massacre.
 Brittany Mountain, Jordan Taylor, and Nicole George as Brittany, Jordan, and Nicole, three bulimic girls who talk incessantly, gripe about parents, and squabble with one another.
 Bennie Dixon as Benny, an athletic student who helps Acadia escape out of a window before approaching Eric. He is shot and presumed dead.
 Alicia Miles as Acadia, a close friend of John and a member of the Gay-Straight Alliance. She is assumed to have a panic disorder which causes her to freeze and break down in times of fear or stress. During the shooting, Benny discovers her standing still in a classroom and helps her escape from the school and the shooters.

Production

The film began as a documentary that Van Sant had intended to make about the Columbine High School massacre; eventually, the idea of a factual account was dropped.

Elephant was filmed in Van Sant's hometown, Portland, Oregon, in late 2002, on the former campus of Whitaker Middle School (previously Adams High School). Whitaker was closed by the Portland Public Schools in 2001 due to structural problems and safety concerns with the school building. The Whitaker/Adams building, completed in 1969, was torn down in 2007.

There was no initial script before the filming started. The script was "written" to its final form during shooting, with cast members improvising freely and collaborating in the direction of scenes. It was shot over 20 days.

JT LeRoy (a pen name for author Laura Albert) is credited as an associate producer for the film.

Title 
The title Elephant is a tribute to the 1989 BBC short film of the same name, directed by Alan Clarke. Van Sant originally believed Clarke's title referred to the parable of the blind men and an elephant, in which several blind men try to describe an elephant, and each draws different conclusions based on which body part he touched, and Van Sant's film uses that interpretation, as the same general timeline is shown multiple times from multiple viewpoints. Later, Van Sant discovered Clarke's film referred to the phrase "elephant in the room" (the collective denial of some obvious problem).
Also, Gus Van Sant named Chantal Akerman's film Jeanne Dielman, 23 quai du Commerce, 1080 Bruxelles (1975) as an inspiration.

Clarke's film Elephant reflects on sectarian violence in Northern Ireland. Van Sant's minimalist style and use of tracking shots mirrors Clarke's film.

A drawing of an elephant as well as an image of an elephant on a bed throw can be seen in Alex's room while he plays the piano.

Release
The film competed at the Cannes Film Festival in May 2003. Van Sant claimed audiences in attendance at Cannes argued over its quality, leading to altercations.

When Italian youth-oriented TV channel Rai 4 launched in 2008, this film was the first programme to be broadcast on the new channel.

Reception

Critical response
Elephant received mainly positive reviews from critics and has a score of 73% on Rotten Tomatoes based on 160 reviews with an average rating of 7.10/10. The critical consensus states "The movie's spare and unconventional style will divide viewers." The film also has a score of 70 out of 100 on Metacritic based on 37 critics indicating "generally favourable reviews".

Roger Ebert praised the film and gave it 4 out of 4 stars writing "Gus Van Sant's Elephant is a violent movie in the sense that many innocent people are shot dead. But it isn't violent in the way it presents those deaths. There is no pumped-up style, no lingering, no release, no climax. Just implacable, poker-faced, flat, uninflected death. Truffaut said it was hard to make an anti-war film because war was exciting even if you were against it. Van Sant has made an anti-violence film by draining violence of energy, purpose, glamor, reward and social context. It just happens. I doubt that Elephant will ever inspire anyone to copy what they see on the screen. Much more than the insipid message movies shown in social studies classes, it might inspire useful discussion and soul-searching among high school students."

Accolades

Red Lake shootings controversy
The Red Lake shootings that occurred in 2005 were briefly blamed on the film, as it was viewed by gunman Jeff Weise 17 days prior to the event. A friend of Weise said that he brought the film over to a friend's house and skipped ahead to parts that showed two students planning and carrying out a school massacre. Although they talked about the film afterwards, Weise said and did nothing to make anyone suspect what he was planning.

See also
 Eric Harris and Dylan Klebold, the students behind the Columbine High School massacre
 Bowling for Columbine, a documentary about gun violence in America with emphasis on the Columbine massacre
 Duck! The Carbine High Massacre, a film made in 1999 inspired by the Columbine High School massacre
 Heart of America, yet another film revolving around a fictionalized school massacre
 Zero Day, another film inspired by the Columbine High School massacre made in 2003
 The Only Way, a 2004 independent film inspired by the Columbine High School massacre
 2:37, a 2006 film set in Australia that follows the same themes and style
 Run Hide Fight, a 2020 film follows a high school sieged by a quartet of school shooters.
 Mass, A 2021 film involving grieving parents who meet to discuss the aftermath of a school shooting

References

External links

 
 
 
 

2003 films
2003 crime drama films
2003 independent films
2003 LGBT-related films
2000s American films
2000s English-language films
2000s high school films
2000s psychological drama films
2000s teen drama films
American crime drama films
American high school films
American nonlinear narrative films
American psychological drama films
American teen drama films
American teen LGBT-related films
Features based on short films
Films about mass murder
Films about murderers
Films about school bullying
Films about school violence
Films about virginity
Films directed by Gus Van Sant
Films set in Oregon
Films shot in Portland, Oregon
Films with screenplays by Gus Van Sant
HBO Films films
Hyperlink films
LGBT-related drama films
Palme d'Or winners
Works about the Columbine High School massacre